This article lists political parties in Tunisia.
Tunisia was a dominant-party state of the Constitutional Democratic Rally ("RCD" from its French language initials) before the Tunisian revolution. In the aftermath of the revolution the RCD was dissolved by the new state authorities and over 70 new political parties formed. The country is now a multiparty state.  Although there are two numerically major parties, no single party has a realistic chance of governing alone.

Parties represented in the Assembly of the Representatives of the People

Other parties

The following opposition parties exist de jure and/or de facto. On January 20, 2011 the cabinet of the interim government recognized all previously banned parties, with the exception of Hizb ut-Tahrir and a few other parties.

Legalized before the Tunisian revolution
Democratic Forum for Labour and Liberties (FDTL, or Ettakatol)
Ettajdid Movement, or Renewal Movement
Green Party for Progress (PVP)
Movement of Socialist Democrats (MDS)
Popular Unity Party (PUP)
Progressive Democratic Party (PDP), now merged into the Republican Party.
Social Liberal Party (PSL)
Unionist Democratic Union (UDU)
Liberal Democratic Social Party

Legalized after the Tunisian revolution

El Amen Party
Congress for the Republic (CPR)
Cultural Unionist Nation Party
Democratic Alliance Party
Democratic Patriots' Unified Party, formerly the Democratic Patriots' Movement
Democratic Social Nation Party
Equity and Equality Party
Free Patriotic Union
Future Tunisia Party
Green Tunisia Party
Hizb ut-Tahrir or the Liberation Party
Homeland Party or Al Watan
Al Iklaa Party
Initiative
Justice and Development Party
Maghrebi Republican Party (PRM)
Movement of the Republic
New Destour Party
Patriotic and Democratic Labour Party
Parti Democrate Liberal
Patriotic Construction Party
Pirate Party
Popular Unity Movement
Popular Unity Party
Progressive People's Party
Reform and Development Party
Reform Front Party
Republican Party
Social Democratic Path
Socialist Party, formerly the Left Socialist Party
Third Alternative
Third Republic  الجمهورية الثالثة
Tunisia Forward
Tunisian Ba'ath Movement
Tunisian Movement for Freedom and Dignity
Tunisian National Front
Tunisian Nationalist Party
Tunisian Pirate Party
Voice of the People of Tunisia
Wafa Movement
Al-Watan Party
Workers' Party (PT), formerly the Tunisian Workers' Communist Party (PCOT)

Defunct parties
 Destour, founded 1920; split in 1934 resulted in the Neo Destour.
 Neo Destour, which became the PSD in 1964.
 Socialist Destourian Party (PSD), which became the RCD in 1988.
 Constitutional Democratic Rally (RCD). Dissolved in 2011.
 Tunisian Communist Party. Became the Ettajdid Movement.
 Progressive Democratic Party (PDP), merged into the Republican Party.
 Ettajdid Movement. Merged into the Social Democratic Path.
 Free Patriotic Union. Merged into Nidaa Tounes.
 National Destourian Initiative. Merged into Long Live Tunisia.

See also
 Politics of Tunisia
 List of ruling political parties by country

References

Tunisia
 
Political parties
Political parties
Tunisia